O-Acetylpsilocin (also known as psilacetin, 4-acetoxy-DMT, 4-AcO-DMT, or synthetic shrooms) is a semi-synthetic psychoactive drug that has been suggested by David Nichols to be a potentially useful alternative to psilocybin for pharmacological studies, as they are both believed to be prodrugs of psilocin. However, some users report that O-acetylpsilocin's subjective effects differ from those of psilocybin and psilocin. Additionally, some users prefer 4-AcO-DMT to natural psilocybin mushrooms due to feeling fewer adverse side effects such as nausea and heavy body load, which are more frequently reported in experiences involving natural mushrooms. It is the acetylated form of the psilocybin mushroom alkaloid psilocin and is a lower homolog of 4-AcO-MET, 4-AcO-DET, 4-AcO-MiPT and 4-AcO-DiPT.

History 

O-Acetylpsilocin (psilacetin) and several other esters of psilocin were patented on January 16, 1963 by Sandoz Ltd via Albert Hofmann & Franz Troxler. Despite this, psilacetin remains a psychedelic compound with a limited history of use. It is theorized to be a prodrug of psilocin, as is psilocybin, which occurs naturally in many species of hallucinogenic mushrooms. This is because the aromatic acetyl moiety on the 4th position of the indole ring system is subject to deacetylation in acidic conditions such as those found in the stomach. Psilacetin is O-acetylated psilocin, whereas psilocybin is O-phosphorylated.

Chemistry 

O-Acetylpsilocin can be obtained by acetylation of psilocin under alkaline or strongly acidic conditions.  It is, therefore, a synthetic compound. It is believed to be a prodrug of psilocin; however, speculation exists that psilacetin itself also may be psychoactive. O-Acetylpsilocin is more resistant than psilocin to oxidation under basic conditions due to its acetoxy group. While O-acetylpsilocin is not well researched (sometimes viewed negatively as a research chemical, as opposed to psilocin and psilocybin), it is not as difficult as psilocybin to synthesize. Due to their similar proposed mechanisms of action, this factor may provide further support for the proposition that O-acetylpsilocin might serve as an appropriate substitute for psilocybin in research of the application of psychedelic compounds in medicine. It must be noted, however, that the company "http://octarinebio.com/" Octarine,  founded in 2018, has bio-engineered Saccharomyces cerevisiae to produce the psychoactive compounds of psilocybin mushrooms in yeast-fermenting vessels, en masse, much like beer is in fact brewed... In a sense, this renders O-acetylpsilocin only as a legal alternative due to the inaccessibility of Octarine's products on the open market. They mention their https://octarinebio.com/?page_id=174"> "enzymatic glycosylation" and "Tryptamine-Derived Fermentation Manufacturing" process, whereby the end-product is produced. However, accessibility to their product remains a cascade of pharmaceutical red-tape - do not expect any "shroom-beer" on the market anytime soon - or ever, as their modified yeasts are of course patented and not open-source.

Pharmacology 

 See psilocin for more details.

In the body O-acetylpsilocin is deacetylated to psilocin by deacetylases/acetyltransferases during first pass metabolism and during subsequent passes through the liver (evident as psilacetin is also active via parenteral routes of ingestion).

Claims of subjective differences in effects between the acetylated and non-acetylated forms of psilocin vary: some users report that O-acetylpsilocin lasts slightly longer, whilst others report that it lasts for a considerably shorter time.  Many users report less body load and nausea compared with psilocin.  Some users find that the visual effects produced by O-acetylpsilocin more closely resemble those produced by DMT than those produced by psilocin or psilocybin. These differences could be possible if psilacetin is psychoactive in itself and not merely as a prodrug. Despite this, there have been no controlled clinical studies to distinguish among the phenomenological effects of psilacetin, psilocin, and psilocybin.

Legality

Australia

O-Acetylpsilocin can be considered an analog of psilocin making it a Schedule 9 prohibited substance in Australia under the Poisons Standard (October 2015). A Schedule 9 substance is a substance which may be abused or misused, the manufacture, possession, sale or use of which should be prohibited by law except when required for medical or scientific research, or for analytical, teaching or training purposes with approval of Commonwealth and/or State or Territory Health Authorities.

United States
O-Acetylpsilocin is ambiguously legal for use as a lab reagent or research chemical; however, it is an acetate ester of psilocin, meaning it would be considered akin to a Schedule I Controlled Substance under the Federal Analogue Act if sold for human consumption.

United Kingdom

O-Acetylpsilocin, being an ester of psilocin, is a Class A drug in the UK under the Misuse of Drugs Act 1971.

Italy

O-Acetylpsilocin is illegal in Italy as it is an ester of a prohibited substance.

Sweden
The Riksdag added 4-AcO-DMT to Narcotic Drugs Punishments Act under swedish schedule I ("substances, plant materials and fungi which normally do not have medical use" ) as of January 25, 2017, published by Medical Products Agency (MPA) in regulation HSLF-FS 2017:1 listed as 4-acetoxi-N,N-dimetyltryptamin.

Israel
O-Acetylpsilocin is technically illegal in Israel as of being a derivative of DMT

See also 
 4-AcO-DPT
 4-MeO-DMT
 4-PrO-DMT
 ALD-52
 Ayahuasca
 Psilocybin
 Psilocybin mushroom
 Psychedelic drug
 Serotonergic psychedelic
 Tryptamine

References

External links 
 4-AcO-DMT information at IsomerDesign.com
 Erowid 4-Acetoxy-DMT Vault
 "Esters of Indoles" US Patent # 3,075,992 - Awarded to Sandoz Ltd. (via Albert Hofmann & Franz Troxler) on January 29, 1963.

Tryptamine alkaloids
Mycotoxins
Psychedelic tryptamines
Entheogens
Serotonin receptor agonists
Acetate esters
Prodrugs
Designer drugs
Dimethylamino compounds